This is a list of Field Operating Agencies (FOA) in the United States Department of the Air Force that are active.  FOAs report directly to a functional manager in either the Office of the Secretary of the Air Force or the Air Staff. FOAs perform field activities beyond the scope of any of the major commands. Their activities are specialized or associated with an Air Force wide mission.

Current

Historic

Sources
 Airman Magazine 2011 The Book pp. 17–19

External links
 

Field Operating Agencies